Chula Vista, Texas may refer to the following places in the U.S. state of Texas:
Chula Vista, Cameron County, Texas
Chula Vista, Maverick County, Texas
Chula Vista, Zavala County, Texas